Juliet Rose Sargeant (born September 1965) is a British garden designer.  In 2016, her anti-slavery The Modern Slavery Garden was the first show garden by a female black gardener to be exhibited at the Chelsea Flower Show where it won an RHS gold medal and was voted the winner in the BBC’s People’s Choice Award.

Early life and education
She was born in Tanzania to an English mother and a Tanzanian father who had met while he was studying law in London. She moved to England at the age of two. After growing up and going to school in Surrey and Sussex, she qualified as a doctor at the Royal Free Hospital School of Medicine, University of London in 1990. During her studies she also gained a 1st Class Honours Degree in Psychology intending to pursue a career in psychiatry.

Career
Sargeant left medicine after working as a doctor for 4 years, returning to university to study garden design at Capel Manor College and Middlesex University gaining her degree in 1997.  She now lives in Rottingdean near Brighton, and runs a successful garden design business and The Sussex Garden School from offices based in Hurstpierpoint and Alfriston, while also writing books such as New Naturalism and presenting television programmes such as BBC Gardener’s World and ITV’s Village of the Year. She is an active member of the Society of Garden Designers and was their chair from 2014-15 taking on the role when the previous chair suddenly resigned. She was awarded Fellowship of SGD in 2017 for her contributions to the society. In 2018, she was listed as one of BBC's 100 Women.

Awards and accolades
 2016 GG2 Leadership Award
 2016 Evening Standard Top 100 People
 2017 SGD Hard Landscaping Award
 2012 SGD Sustainability Award
 2020 Fellowship of the Landscape Institute

References

External links
Award winning garden designs by Juliet Sargeant – personal website

Alumni of Middlesex University
Horticulturists
Living people
1965 births
BBC 100 Women
Date of birth missing (living people)